The 2013–14 AHL season was the 78th season of the American Hockey League. The regular season began on October 4, 2013, and ended on April 19, 2014. The 2014 Calder Cup playoffs followed the conclusion of the regular season. The Calder Cup was won by the Texas Stars for their first Calder Cup in franchise history.

Regular season

The 2013–14 edition of the AHL Outdoor Classic took place on December 13, 2013 and was hosted by the Rochester Americans against the Lake Erie Monsters at Frontier Field in Rochester, New York. The Americans won the game 5–4 in a shootout before a crowd of 11,015 spectators.

The Americans also took part in the 2013 Spengler Cup between December 26 and 31, 2013, the first time since 1996 that an AHL team has participated in the tournament.

Team and NHL affiliation changes

Relocations
The Houston Aeros relocated to Des Moines, Iowa, and became the Iowa Wild but remained affiliated to the Minnesota Wild.
The Peoria Rivermen relocated to Utica, New York, and changed their name to the Utica Comets.

Affiliation changes

Name changes

The Connecticut Whale reverted to their former name, the Hartford Wolf Pack.

Standings

Eastern Conference

Western Conference

Statistical leaders

Leading skaters 
The following players are sorted by points, then goals. Updated as of the end of the regular season.

GP = Games played; G = Goals; A = Assists; Pts = Points; +/– = Plus-minus; PIM = Penalty minutes

Leading goaltenders 
The following goaltenders with a minimum 1500 minutes played lead the league in goals against average. Updated as of the end of the regular season.

GP = Games played; TOI = Time on ice (in minutes); SA = Shots against; GA = Goals against; SO = Shutouts; GAA = Goals against average; SV% = Save percentage; W = Wins; L = Losses; OT = Overtime/shootout loss

Calder Cup playoffs

AHL awards

All-Star teams
First All-Star Team
Jake Allen (G)
T. J. Brennan (D)
Adam Clendening (D) 
Mike Hoffman (LW) 
Travis Morin (C) 
Colton Sceviour (RW)

Second All-Star Team
Petr Mrazek (G)
Adam Almqvist (D) 
Brad Hunt (D) 
Zach Boychuk (LW) 
Andy Miele (C) 
Spencer Abbott (RW)

All-Rookie Team
Joni Ortio (G)
 Brenden Kichton (D)
 Ryan Sproul (D)
 Curtis McKenzie (F)
 Teemu Pulkkinen (F)
 Ryan Strome (F)

2014 AHL All-Stars
This was the AHL roster for a game against Färjestad BK on February 12, 2014. The AHL All-stars won the game 7–2.

Milestones
 Manchester Monarchs coach Mark Morris became the 17th coach in AHL history to reach career 300 victories, with a win on November 13, 2013.
 Worcester Sharks coach Roy Sommer set a record for AHL games coached by coaching his 1,257th game on March 26, 2014, surpassing the previous record by Frank Mathers.

See also
List of AHL seasons
2013 in ice hockey
2014 in ice hockey

References

External links
AHL official site

 
American Hockey League seasons
2
2